Ahmed Abdel-Qader Abu Ismail (born 10 November 1968) is a Jordanian football manager and former player.

International goals

Managerial career

Jordan
In 2005, Abdel-Qader was appointed as assistant coach of Jordan national under-20 football team where he served under the Danish coach Jan Poulsen from 2005 to 2007. Abdel-Qader is known for helping the Jordan U-20 team qualify for the 2007 FIFA U-20 World Cup in Canada after securing fourth place in the 2006 AFC Youth Championship in India. After Jordan's elimination from the group stage in the 2007 FIFA U-20 World Cup, Abdel-Qader was appointed as head coach of Jordan U-20 until 2008.

Abdel-Qader was appointed as assistant coach of the Jordan national football team where he served under the Portuguese coach Nelo Vingada in 2008 and the Iraqi coach Adnan Hamad from 2009 to 2013.

Achievements as manager

Honors
With Jordan (Assistant)
Pan Arab Games (0): 
Runners-up 2011 Pan Arab Games

References

External links
Ahmed Abdel-Qader - GOALZZ.com

1968 births
Living people
Jordanian footballers
Jordan international footballers
Association football defenders
Jordanian football managers
Jordan national football team managers
Expatriate football managers in Oman
Jordanian expatriates in Oman
Al-Faisaly SC managers
That Ras Club managers
Sahab SC managers
Shabab Al-Ordon Club managers
Oman Professional League managers
Jordanian Pro League managers
Saham SC managers